Joseph Mellor Hanson (1900-1963) was a British-born modernist painter who worked primarily in figure painting, with an abstract approach. His work can be placed in the tradition of geometric abstraction.

Education 
Hanson was born on the family farm in the West Riding of Yorkshire, England. He began studying art at fifteen and took evening drawing classes to prepare him for admission to Halifax Technical College. He received a McRae Scholarship at nineteen to support his studies and graduated in 1924.

Training 
Hanson studied in Paris from 1925 to 1935 with Othon Friesz and was his first student; he subsequently became Friesz’ assistant in his studio. By 1928, Hanson had progressed far enough to participate in the Salon des Artistes Indépendants and presented a solo exhibition at the Galerie “Mots et Images”. He continued to paint and exhibit throughout his life.

During his years in Paris, Hanson was associated with several influential artists of the period, Andre L’Hôte, Fernand Léger, Jean Hélion, as well as Othon Friesz. He was also closely associated with Amédée Ozenfant, acting from 1927 to 1935 as his assistant in the execution of murals and helping with the instruction of pupils in his private art academy.

Career 
In 1935 Hanson returned to England, and after a year in London, he taught until 1938 in a small grammar school in Shropshire. In 1939 he settled in New York City and, in 1945, began teaching at Cornell University. At his retirement he was a Professor of Art in the College of Architecture, which is now a part of the Cornell University College of Architecture, Art and Planning.

Hanson worked in a highly disciplined style and left behind a relatively small but distinguished body of work. A large portion of his art was donated to the Andrew Dickson White Museum of Art, now the Herbert F. Johnson Museum of Art at Cornell University as a bequest of the artist. His work was explored by Paul Ziff in his 1962 monograph on the artist published by the Cornell University Press.

Exhibitions 
Galerie "Mots et Images," Paris, France 1928
Société des Artistes Indépendants (a.k.a. Salon des Sur-Indépendants) Paris, France 1928-1929-1930
Galerie Aubier, Paris, France 1929
Galerie Jeanne Castel, Paris, France 1935
Wertheim Gallery, London, England 1937-1938
Bankfield Museum, Halifax, England 1938
Passedoit Gallery, New York, New York, U.S. 1941-1957
The Carnegie Institute, Pittsburgh, Pennsylvania, U.S. 1943-1950
Art Institute of Chicago, Chicago, Illinois, U.S. 1950
Toledo Museum of Art, Toledo, Ohio, U.S. 1950
Cranbrook Academy of Art, Bloomfield Hills, Michigan, U.S. 1953
Museum of Modern Art, 25th Anniversary, New York, New York, U.S. 1954
Nebraska Art Association, Lincoln, Nebraska, U.S. 1954
Corcoran Gallery of Art, Washington, D.C., U.S. 1959
Herbert F. Johnson Museum of Art (Formerly the A.D. White MuseumW) Ithaca, New York, U.S. 1960
source:

Museum collections 
Bankfield Museum, Halifax, England
Museum of Modern Art, New York, New York U.S.
Georgia Museum of Art, Athens, Georgia, U.S.
National Museum Cardiff, Cardiff, Wales
The Hepworth Wakefield, Yorkshire, England
William Rockhill Nelson Gallery of Art, Kansas City, Missouri, U.S.
Herbert F. Johnson Museum of Art, Ithaca, New York, U.S.
source:

References

External links 
 https://normandaly.com/biography/joseph-hanson/

20th-century American artists
Modernists
1900 births
1963 deaths
Cornell University faculty
British expatriates in France
British emigrants to the United States